The Ex-Duke (US title The interloper) is a 1924 thriller novel by the British author E. Phillips Oppenheim.

Film adaptation
In 1926 the novel was adapted into the American silent film Prince of Tempters directed by Lothar Mendes and starring Lois Moran, Ben Lyon, Lya De Putti.

References

Bibliography
 Goble, Alan. The Complete Index to Literary Sources in Film. Walter de Gruyter, 199

1924 British novels
Novels by E. Phillips Oppenheim
British novels adapted into films
Hodder & Stoughton books